Fuirena, called umbrella sedges or umbrella grasses, are a genus of flowering plants in the sedge family (Cyperaceae), with a worldwide distribution, chiefly in the tropics and temperate zones. They are named for Danish physician and early botanist Georg Fuiren (Jorgen Furenius), 1581–1628.

Species
Species currently accepted by The Plant List are as follows: 
Fuirena abnormalis C.B.Clarke
Fuirena angolensis (C.B.Clarke) Lye ex J.Raynal & Roessler
Fuirena arenosa R.Br.
Fuirena bernieri Cherm.
Fuirena bidgoodiae Hoenselaar & Muasya
Fuirena boreocoerulescens Lye
Fuirena breviseta (Coville) Coville
Fuirena bullifera J.Raynal & Roessler
Fuirena bushii Kral
Fuirena camptotricha C.Wright
Fuirena ciliaris (L.) Roxb.
Fuirena claviseta Peter
Fuirena coerulescens Steud.
Fuirena cuspidata (Roth) Kunth
Fuirena ecklonii Nees
Fuirena enodis C.B.Clarke
Fuirena felicis S.S.Hooper
Fuirena friesii Kük.
Fuirena gracilis Kunth
Fuirena hirsuta (P.J.Bergius) P.L.Forbes
Fuirena incompleta Nees
Fuirena incrassata S.T.Blake
Fuirena lainzii Luceño & M.Alves
Fuirena leptostachya Oliv.
Fuirena longa Chapm.
Fuirena microcarpa Lye
Fuirena moritziana Boeckeler
Fuirena mutali Muasya & Nordal
Fuirena nudiflora S.T.Blake
Fuirena nyasensis Nelmes
Fuirena obcordata P.L.Forbes
Fuirena ochreata Nees ex Kunth
Fuirena oedipus C.B.Clarke
Fuirena pachyrrhiza Ridl.
Fuirena ponmudiensis Ravi & Anil Kumar
Fuirena pubescens (Poir.) Kunth
Fuirena pumila (Torr.) Spreng.
Fuirena quercina Cherm.
Fuirena repens Boeckeler
Fuirena rhizomatifera Tang & F.T.Wang
Fuirena robusta Kunth
Fuirena sagittata Lye
Fuirena scirpoidea Michx.
Fuirena simplex Vahl
Fuirena simpsonii Ravi, N.Mohanan & Shaju
Fuirena somaliensis Lye
Fuirena squarrosa Michx.
Fuirena stephani Ramos & Diego
Fuirena striatella Lye
Fuirena stricta Steud.
Fuirena subdigitata C.B.Clarke
Fuirena swamyi Govind.
Fuirena tenuis P.L.Forbes
Fuirena trilobites C.B.Clarke
Fuirena tuwensis M.B.Deshp. & Shah
Fuirena umbellata Rottb.
Fuirena uncinata (Willd.) Kunth
Fuirena welwitschii Ridl.
Fuirena zambesiaca Lye

References

Cyperaceae genera
Cyperaceae